Apfeldorf is a municipality in the district of Landsberg in Bavaria in Germany.

Geography
Apfeldorf lies in the middle of the towns of Landsberg am Lech, Schongau and Weilheim, about 40 km north of the northern edge of the Alps, at an altitude of about 660 m ASL. The river Lech flows through the village. Apfeldorf is situated in the Northern Alpine Foreland.

Landmarks
The Church of the Holy Spirit has a Romanesque west tower saddle roof.

References

Landsberg (district)